Sarah Alexander (née Smith; 3 January 1971) is an English actress. She has appeared in British series including Armstrong and Miller, Smack the Pony, Coupling, The Worst Week of My Life, Green Wing, Marley's Ghosts and Jonathan Creek.

Early life
Alexander was born on 3rd January 1971 in Hammersmith, London. Her father, Frank Smith, was a television producer and director on factual shows such as Panorama; he died when she was still at school. She attended Godolphin and Latymer School in Hammersmith. At the age of 19, she left home after her A-levels and travelled to the Edinburgh Festival Fringe to get a start in acting. Her parents wanted her to continue to university, but she turned down a place at the University of Manchester to take her first professional acting job.

Career
In 1992, Alexander appeared in The Bill, as a witness to an attempted robbery. The following year she played Muriel in an episode of the BBC comedy-drama Lovejoy. In 1994, she played Nicky, Damien's risk-addicted weather reporter girlfriend in Drop the Dead Donkey. In 1996, she played Beatrice in the British première of Octavio Paz's only play, Rappaccini's Daughter, at the Gate Theatre Studio. She has appeared in other theatre productions, including The Vagina Monologues, Hand in Hand, The Secretary Bird, Northanger Abbey, and as Lady Macbeth in Macbeth. In the mid-1990s, she met Ben Miller when they filmed an advertisement for disposable cameras together, and through him she met Alexander Armstrong. Miller and Armstrong became friends and collaborators, and Alexander went on to appear on their Channel 4 sketch show Armstrong and Miller (1997–2001), usually in the regular "Nude Practice" segment.

Alexander moved into comedy acting, in which she has since specialised. Her other sketch show work included Smith and Jones (1997–1998) and Smack the Pony (1999–2003), also writing for the latter. In the science-fiction comedy series Red Dwarf, she played the Queen of Camelot in "Stoke Me a Clipper". She also appeared in the Midsomer Murders episode "The Garden of Death", as Fliss Inkpen-Thomas. In 2000, she appeared in the comedy The Strangerers, as well as becoming co-host of the final series of the current-affairs satire The 11 O'Clock Show, alongside Jon Holmes. She made her debut as Susan Walker in the BBC sitcom Coupling, which ran for four series from 2000 to 2004. Other British TV roles included Mel in The Worst Week of My Life and Angela Hunter in the hospital comedy Green Wing.

Alexander appeared as Alice Fletcher in NBC's short-lived remake of the British comedy series Teachers, before roles in the films I Could Never Be Your Woman and Stardust (both released in 2007). Her previous film credits include Seaview Knights (1994) and Going Off Big Time (2000). She also starred in the 2008 BBC dramedy Mutual Friends, and played Layla Barton in the BBC drama All The Small Things, which debuted in 2009.

Since 2011, she has played Mimi in the BBC Radio 4 comedy series The Gobetweenies. The first series was broadcast in 2011 and two more followed in 2012 and 2013. She starred in the 2012 BBC series Me and Mrs Jones. Since 2013, she has starred in the BBC One series Jonathan Creek as Polly Creek, wife of main character Jonathan, making her first appearance in the episode titled "The Clue of the Savant's Thumb" in 2013. She starred in the Dave comedy Undercover as DS Zoe Keller. From 2015 she has starred in the comedy series Marley's Ghosts on Gold. In 2019, Alexander appeared as  Undine Thwaite in the Epix series Pennyworth.

Other work
Alexander has contributed to the BBC charity telethon Comic Relief, appearing in 2001 as a judge based on Nicki Chapman in a parody of Popstars, in 2003 as Liza Goddard in a spoof of Blankety Blank, and in 2005 in a celebrity version of University Challenge.

Personal life
In 2001, Alexander was in a relationship with actor Gerald Harper. In 2002 she began a new relationship with writer and actor Peter Serafinowicz. Alexander later married Serafinowicz, and the couple have a son and daughter together. She appeared in both series of Look Around You, which Serafinowicz co-created and starred in, as well as O!News, his internet spoof of E! News.

Filmography

Film

Television

References

External links

1971 births
English film actresses
English television actresses
Living people
People from Hammersmith
People educated at Godolphin and Latymer School
20th-century English actresses
21st-century English actresses
Actresses from London